Cereopsius strandi is a species of beetle in the family Cerambycidae. It was described by Stephan von Breuning in 1942. It is known from Thailand.

References

Cereopsius
Beetles described in 1942